The Service Entry Badge was a commemorative medal of Der Stahlhelm, Bund der Frontsoldaten  established on 13 November 1933 by Franz Seldte. The badge was awarded to recognize Der Stahlhelm service "during the harsh years of struggle" (1918–1933).

History
The Service Entry Badge displayed a German helmet above a year number, indicating the bearer's year of joining, ca. 1862. The lowest (and most respected) number was "1918," the year of the founding of Der Stahlhelm. The badges extended upwards to the year 1932. A sleeve chevron was also available for members of Der Stahlhelm who joined the Sturmabteilung (SA). Only one badge could be awarded, and more than one badge could not be worn on the veteran's uniform.

References

External links

 Service Entry Badge of Der Stahlhelm, Bund der Frontsoldaten at Antique Photos

1933 establishments in Germany
Aftermath of World War I in Germany
Awards established in 1933
Der Stahlhelm, Bund der Frontsoldaten
Orders, decorations, and medals of Nazi Germany